The high courts of India are the highest courts of appellate jurisdiction in each state and union territory of India. However, a high court exercises its original civil and criminal jurisdiction only if the subordinate courts are not authorized by law to try such matters for lack of pecuniary, territorial jurisdiction. High courts may also enjoy original jurisdiction in certain matters, if so designated specially by the constitution, a state or union law.

The work of most high courts primarily consists of appeals from lower courts and writ petitions in terms of Articles 226 and 227 of the constitution. Writ jurisdiction is also an original jurisdiction of a high court.

Each state is divided into judicial districts presided over by a district and sessions judge. He is known as district judge when he presides over a civil case, and session's judge when he presides over a criminal case. He is the highest judicial authority below a high court judge. Below him, there are courts of civil jurisdiction, known by different names in different states. Under Article 141 of the constitution, all courts in India – including high courts – are bounded by the judgements and orders of the Supreme Court of India by precedence.

Judges in a high court are appointed by the president of India in consultation with the chief justice of India and the governor of the state under Article 217 of the Constitution but through subsequent judicial interpretations, the primacy of the appointment process is on the hands of the Judicial Collegium. High courts are headed by a chief justice. The chief justices rank fourteenth (within their respective states) and seventeenth (outside their respective states) on the Indian order of precedence. The number of judges in a court is decided by dividing the average institution of main cases during the last five years by the national average, or the average rate of disposal of main cases per judge per year in that high court, whichever is higher.

The Calcutta High Court is the oldest high court in the country, established on 2 July 1862. High courts that handle numerous cases of a particular region have permanent benches established there. Benches are also present in states which come under the jurisdiction of a court outside its territorial limits. Smaller states with few cases may have circuit benches established. Circuit benches (known as circuit courts in some parts of the world) are temporary courts which hold proceedings for a few selected months in a year. Thus cases built up during this interim period are judged when the circuit court is in session. According to a study conducted by Bangalore-based N.G.O, Daksh, on 21 high courts in collaboration with the Ministry of Law and Justice in March 2015, it was found that average pendency of a case in high courts in India is 3 years.

The buildings of Bombay High Court (as part of the Victorian and art deco ensemble of Mumbai) and Punjab and Haryana High Court (as part of the architectural work of Le Corbusier) are UNESCO World Heritage Sites.

High courts 

The Madras High Court in Chennai (est. 1862), Bombay High Court in Mumbai (est. 1862), Calcutta High Court in Kolkata (est. 1862), Allahabad High Court in Allahabad (est. 1866) and Bangalore High Court in Bangalore (est. 1884) are the five oldest high courts in India. The Andhra High Court and Telangana High Court are the newest high courts, established on 1 January 2019 according to Andhra Pradesh Reorganisation Act, 2014.

The following are the 25 high courts in India, sorted by name, year established, act by which it was established, jurisdiction, principal seat (headquarters), permanent benches (subordinate to the principal seat), circuit benches (functional a few days in a month/year), the maximum number of judges sanctioned and the presiding chief justice of the high court:

High courts by states/union territories

Courts under a high court
 District Court
 District Munsiff Court
 Courts of Judicial Magistrate of First Class
 Court of Judicial Magistrate of Second Class
 E-courts

See also 
 List of current Indian chief justices
 List of sitting judges of the high courts of India
 Pendency of court cases in India

References

Further reading

External links

 
High Courts